The Obi Islands (also known as Ombirah, Indonesian: Kepulauan Obi) are a group of 42 islands in the Indonesian province of North Maluku, north of Buru and Ceram, and south of Halmahera. With a total area of 3,048.08 km2, they had a population of 41,455 at the 2010 Census and 50,760 at the 2020 Census. The official estimate as at mid 2021 was 51,510.

Geography
Obi Island, also called Obira Island, is the largest island in the Obi Islands archipelago. It is surrounded by many small islands, including Bisa Island (174.42 km2), Obilatu Island (65.30 km2), Gata-gata Island, Latu Island, Woka Island, and Tomini Island. Obi Island is bordered by the Maluku Sea to the west, the Seram Sea to the south, and the Obi Strait to the north and east. The major islands closest to it are Bacan Island to the north and Ambon to the south. Obi Island's topography is generally in the form of hills with a short coastline. The hilly surface results in many springs and rivers. Lake Kapi, in the west, is its largest lake.

Administration
The Obi Islands are part of South Halmahera Regency. The archipelago is directly bordered by the rest of North Maluku Province to the north and west, by Maluku Province in the south and by West Papua Province in the east. Obi Island and the surrounding small islands are divided into five administrative districts (kecamatan), which are sub-divided into 34 administrative villages (desa and kelurahan), with villages further subdivided into hamlets. Of the five districts, three comprise the main Obi Island, although each district also includes neighbouring smaller islands - Obi District includes the southern part of Bisa Island to the north of Obi Island, Obi Timur District includes Tobalai Island to the east, and Obi Selatan Island also includes Gomumu Island to the south. The other two districts include no part of Obi Island; Obi Barat District includes Obilatu and Belangbelang Islands to the west of Obi Island, together with the southern part (Tapa desa) of Tapat Island, while Obi Utara District includes the main part of Bisa Island to the north of Obi Island, together with the northern part (Pasir Putih desa) of Tapat Island.

Demographics
The population of the Obi Islands Group was 51,510 people in mid 2021, with a population density of 16.90 people per square kilometre. All inhabitants on the Obi Island are migrants, as these islands had no indigenous population. The first groups to settle on Obi Island were the Buton, followed by immigrants from Tobelo-Galela, Ternate, Tidore, Makian-Kayoa, Bugis, Makassar and Java. Almost all of the residents are scattered along the coast with the highlands mostly uninhabited jungle. However, there are some worker settlements in hilly areas which have mines and temporary settlements for clove farmers used during clove harvesting season. Infrastructure, especially in terms of modern medical facilities, is lacking. 

The languages spoken on the islands are Galela and Tobelo, which belong to the West Papuan language family.

Villages
The five districts are sub-divided into villages (rural desa and urban kelurahan), listed below with their areas and their populations at the 2020 Census. The administrative centres of the five districts are denoted by asterisks.

Economy
The dominant plantation products in the Obi Islands are cloves, nutmeg, coconut, and pepper. The main economic potential of the islands s in the mining sector. The island has resources of gold, coal, nickel, cement, and petroleum. In 2016, provincial governor Abdul Ghani Kasuba successfully negotiated for the China-based Jinchun Group to build a 620 million dollar nickel smelter on the main island.

Some mining companies in this islands are:
 Halmahera Persada Lygend
 Halmahera Jaya Feronikel
 Megah Surya Pratiwi
 Trimegah Bangun Persada
 Wanatiara Persada

Notes

Archipelagoes of Indonesia
Landforms of North Maluku
Islands of the Maluku Islands
Populated places in Indonesia